Coleophora caucasica is a moth of the family Coleophoridae. It is found in Asia Minor.

References

caucasica
Moths described in 1867
Moths of Asia